Ulysses & Mona is a 2018 French drama film directed by Sébastien Betbeder. It was screened in the Contemporary World Cinema section at the 2018 Toronto International Film Festival.

Cast
 Manal Issa as Mona
 Eric Cantona as Ulysse
 Mathis Romani as Arthur
 Marie Vialle as Alice
 Quentin Dolmaire as Camille

References

External links
 

2018 films
2018 drama films
French drama films
2010s French-language films
2010s French films